Diogo Moreira Nascimento (born 23 April 2004) is a Brazilian motorcycle racer, currently competing in the Moto3 World Championship for MT Helmets – MSI.

Career
After starting his motorcycle career in motocross in Brazil, Moreira moved to Spain in 2017 in order to continue his career. In 2019, he made his debut in the Talent Cup of the CEV International Championship, obtaining one victory and three podiums, finishing in sixth place. In 2020, he moved to the Moto3 class also of the CEV, having a fifth place as his best result and finishing eleventh. In 2021, he remained in the same category, finishing eleventh again.

In 2022, Moreira entered in the world championship in the Moto3 class with the MT Helmets - MSI team who entrust him with a KTM RC250GP, his teammate was Ryusei Yamanaka. He took his first pole at the British Grand Prix at Silverstone and finished the season in eighth place in the standings, making him the rookie of the year.

Career statistics

Grand Prix motorcycle racing

By season

By class

Races by year
(key) (Races in bold indicate pole position; races in italics indicate fastest lap)

References

2004 births
Living people
Sportspeople from São Paulo
Brazilian motorcycle racers
Moto3 World Championship riders
21st-century Brazilian people